Donald "Donnie" Ernsberger (born October 13, 1996) is an American football tight end who is a free agent. He played college football at Western Michigan.

College career
Ernsberger played four seasons for the Western Michigan Broncos football team, playing both fullback and tight end. He was used primarily as a blocker in the Broncos offense his first three seasons and was named a third-team All-MAC selection as a junior. As a senior, Ernsberger caught 34 passes for 394 and four touchdowns and was named second-team All-MAC and participated in the NFLPA Collegiate Bowl.

Professional career

Tampa Bay Buccaneers
Ernsberger signed with the Tampa Bay Buccaneers as an undrafted free agent on April 28, 2018. Ernsberger was ultimately waived by the team with an injury settlement during training camp. The Buccaneers later re-signed Ernsberger to their practice squad on November 28, 2018. He was promoted to the Buccaneers active roster on December 18, 2018.

On July 31, 2019, Ernsberger was waived by the Buccaneers.

Jacksonville Jaguars
On August 1, 2019, Ernsberger was claimed off waivers by the Jacksonville Jaguars. He was waived by the Jaguars during final roster cuts on August 31, 2019.

DC Defenders
On November 22, 2019, Ernsberger was drafted by the DC Defenders in the 2020 XFL Supplemental Draft. He signed a contract with the league during mini-camp in December 2019. He had his contract terminated when the league suspended operations on April 10, 2020.

Tennessee Titans
On August 5, 2021, Ernsberger signed with the Tennessee Titans. On August 11, 2021, Ernsberger was waived/injured and placed on injured reserve, but was waived off injured reserve on August 14, 2021.

References

External links
Western Michigan Broncos bio
Tampa Bay Buccaneers bio

1996 births
Living people
Sportspeople from Battle Creek, Michigan
Players of American football from Michigan
American football tight ends
Western Michigan Broncos football players
Tampa Bay Buccaneers players
Jacksonville Jaguars players
DC Defenders players
Tennessee Titans players